Goodenia leptoclada, commonly known as thin-stemmed goodenia, is a species of flowering plant in the family Goodeniaceae and is endemic to the extreme south-west of Western Australia. It is an ascending perennial herb with lance-shaped to egg-shaped leaves with the narrower end towards the base and racemes of blue flowers.

Description

Taxonomy and naming
Goodenia laevis was first formally described in 1868 by George Bentham in Flora Australiensis from specimens collected by James Drummond. The specific epithet (leptoclada) means "thin-stemmed".

Distribution and habitat
Thin-stemmed goodenia grows in sandy soil in the Esperance Plains, Jarrah Forest, Swan Coastal Plain and  Warren biogeographic regions in the extreme south-west of Western Australia.

Conservation status
Goddenia leptoclada is classified as "not threatened" by the Department of Environment and Conservation (Western Australia).

References

leptoclada
Eudicots of Western Australia
Plants described in 1868
Taxa named by George Bentham